Manfred Matuschewski (born 2 September 1939) is a retired track and field athlete from Germany.

Matuschewski was born in Weimar. He competed in the 800 m event where he finished sixth at the 1960 Olympics. He was a two-time European champion 1962 and 1966.

References
 

German male middle-distance runners
Athletes (track and field) at the 1960 Summer Olympics
Athletes (track and field) at the 1964 Summer Olympics
Olympic athletes of the United Team of Germany
1939 births
Living people
Sportspeople from Weimar
European Athletics Championships medalists
Recipients of the Banner of Labor